Mugberia Gangadhar Mahavidyalaya, established in 1964, is one of the oldest colleges in Purba Medinipur district, West Bengal, India. It offers undergraduate courses in arts, commerce and sciences. It is affiliated to Vidyasagar University.

Departments

Science

Chemistry
Mathematics
Physics
Geography
Nutrition 
Botany
Zoology
Physiology
Economics
M.Sc in Mathematics

Commerce
B.Com General from 1985-1986.
B.Com Honours from 1996-1997.

Arts

Bengali
English
Sanskrit
History
Geography
Political Science
Philosophy
Music
Physical Education
Education
M.A in Bengali

Physical Education
B.P.Ed.
M.P.Ed
Vocational Programme

 B.Voc in Food Processing
 B.Voc in Tourism in Hotel Management
 M.Voc in Food Technology, Nutrition and Management.

Community College (Diploma)

 Diploma in Tourism and Hotel Management
 Diploma in Computer Application and IT
 Diploma in Soil Management by Vermi Composting

   '''Certificate Course

 Certificate Course in Income Tax Practice
 Certificate Course in Communicative English
 Certificate Course in Human Rights.
 Certificate Course in Business Management.
 Certificate Course in Yoga Therapy.
 Certificate Course in Vermi Composting

Accreditation
Recently, Mugberia Gangadhar Mahavidyalaya has been re-accredited and awarded B+ grade with CGPA 2.71 by the National Assessment and Accreditation Council (NAAC). The college is also recognized by the University Grants Commission (UGC).

Recognition
The Department of Physical Education of Mugberia Gangadhar Mahavidyalaya was recognized by the National Council for Teacher Education (NCTE) Eastern Regional Committee (ERC) Bhubaneswar in 2007 to conduct the Bachelor of Physical Education (B. P. Ed.) and in 2014 for Master of Physical Education (M. P. Ed.)Courses

See also

References

External links
 Mugberia Gangadhar Mahavidyalaya

Colleges affiliated to Vidyasagar University
Educational institutions established in 1964
Universities and colleges in Purba Medinipur district
1964 establishments in West Bengal